The Association of Writers & Writing Programs (AWP) is a nonprofit literary organization that provides support, advocacy, resources, and community to nearly 50,000 writers, 500 college and university creative writing programs, and 125 writers' conferences and centers. It was founded in 1967 by R. V. Cassill and George Garrett.

History
AWP, originally named the Associated Writing Programs, was established as a nonprofit organization in 1967 by fifteen writers representing thirteen creative writing programs. The new association sought to support the growing presence of literary writers in higher education. It accepted both institutional and individual members, and it aimed to persuade the academic community that the creation of literature had a place in the academy as important as the study of literature did.

AWP has helped North America to develop a literature as diverse as its peoples. Member programs have provided literary education to students and aspiring writers from all backgrounds, economic classes, races, and ethnic origins.

AWP has also supported the development of hundreds of educational programs, conferences, reading series, and literary magazines, as well as thousands of jobs for writers and new audiences for contemporary literature. AWP's membership fees have grown exponentially since their inception.

AWP Conference & Bookfair
The AWP Conference & Bookfair is the largest and most inclusive literary conference in North America. AWP hosts an annual conference in a different region of North America, featuring over 2,000 presenters and 550 presentations, readings, lectures, panel discussions, book signings, and receptions. The conference is held in the late winter or early spring of each year, and attracts more than 12,000 attendees and 800 bookfair exhibitors.

AWP's first conference was held in 1973 at the Library of Congress, and it hosted six events and 16 presenters. George Garrett, one of AWP's founders, planned the first gathering with help from the National Endowment for the Arts. Presenters included Elliott Coleman, founder of the Writing Seminars at Johns Hopkins University, Paul Engle, founder of the Iowa Writers' Workshop, poets Josephine Jacobsen and Miller Williams, and novelists Ralph Ellison and Wallace Stegner, among others.

AWP enters into literary partnerships with allied literary organizations like the Academy of American Poets, the Authors Guild, Cave Canem Foundation, the Center for Fiction, Community of Literary Magazines & Presses, Kundiman, National Book Critics Circle, Poetry Society of America, and Writers in the Schools to serve our association's various constituencies and to provide the outstanding featured programming at the conference. Two or three featured events, including the keynote address, are created by the Conference Steering Committee of the AWP Board of Trustees.

Conference history

The AWP Conference & Bookfair has shown significant growth since the early 2000s, transforming from a small conference of only a couple thousand attendees, 300 exhibitors, and less than 200 events to over 12,000 attendees, 800 exhibitors, and 550 events today. Recent destinations include, Chicago (2012), Boston (2013), Seattle (2014), Minneapolis (2015), Los Angeles (2016), Washington, DC (2017), Tampa (2018), and Portland, OR (2019). Other conference locations have included Atlanta (2007), Austin (2006), Denver (2010), Miami (1991), New York (2008), Pittsburgh (1995), San Diego (1985), San Francisco (1988), and Vancouver (2005).

The AWP Conference & Bookfair has established itself as an invaluable part of literary culture. Every year, conference presenters include many winners of the most prestigious literary prizes in the world, including the Man Booker Prize, the National Book Award, the National Book Critics Circle Award, the Nobel Prize, the Pulitzer Prize, as well a MacArthur and Guggenheim fellows. Past lectures and readings have featured Chimamanda Ngozi Adichie, Margaret Atwood, Anne Carson, Michael Chabon, Sandra Cisneros, Don DeLillo, Rita Dove, Jennifer Egan, Louise Erdrich, Nikki Giovanni, Terrance Hayes, Seamus Heaney, John Irving, Ha Jin, Erik Larson, Carolyn Forché, Roxane Gay, Ursula K. Le Guin, Jonathan Lethem, Barry Lopez, Jhumpa Lahiri, Chang-rae Lee, Alice McDermott, Joyce Carol Oates, Sharon Olds, Robert Pinsky, Annie Proulx, Claudia Rankine, Marilynne Robinson, Karen Russell, Richard Russo, Cheryl Strayed, Amy Tan, Natasha Trethewey, Derek Walcott, Colson Whitehead, Jeanette Winterson, and Tobias Wolff.

Future conference locations

Seattle, Washington
March 08–11, 2023
Seattle Convention Center

Magazine

For more than four decades, The Writer's Chronicle has served as a leading source of articles, news, and information for writers, editors, students, and teachers of writing. Published six times a year, the Chronicle provides diverse insights into the art of writing that are accessible, pragmatic, and idealistic. Each issue features in-depth essays on the craft of writing, as well as extensive interviews with accomplished authors. Readers can also find news on publishing trends and literary controversies; a listing of grants, awards, and publication opportunities available to writers; and a list of upcoming conferences for writers, including AWP's Annual Conference & Bookfair. The Chronicles pages are for those who love reading and writing.

Awards sponsored

AWP sponsors six contests, and also provides an extensive listing of literary grants, awards, and publication opportunities available from organizations and publishers throughout North America. Their contests include the AWP Award Series, the George Garrett Award, the Small Press Publisher Award, the Intro Journals Project, the Kurt Brown Prizes, and the National Program Directors' Prize.

Grace Paley Prize
The Grace Paley Prize is an American literary award presented by the Association of Writers & Writing Programs. The award carries a prize of $5,000 and a publishing contract with the University of Massachusetts Press.

Controversies 
Vanessa Place was removed from the 2016 Los Angeles Subcommittee to satisfy concerns of the AWP membership after Place received criticism for a Twitter art project where she retyped the entire text from the 1936 novel Gone with the Wind in an effort to call attention to the novel's inherent racism. While some have argued the Twitter account was meant to scrutinize and call attention to stereotyping and racism in Gone With the Wind, others accused it of being racist or insensitive itself, which resulted in not only the removal of Place from the subcommittee, but also a number of other literary organizations canceling appearances by Place.

In anticipation of the 2016 AWP Conference & Bookfair in Los Angeles, some members of the organization objected to what they felt was a lack of programming specific to literature and disabilities. A petition was started that claimed the subcommittee responsible for selecting the events rejected all proposals having to do with disability, while some sources responded this claim was erroneous, the Deaf & Disabled Writers Caucus is not a panel but a networking event. AWP implemented changes for the 2016 conference to further efforts to provide increased accommodations for disabled attendees, which included an onsite location where attendees could report accessibility issues, improved signage, and reserved seating throughout the conference, as well as updates to the Accessibility Services throughout the event.

For the 2017 AWP Conference & Bookfair in Washington, D.C., the number of proposals related to literature and disability increased, and subsequently the subcommittee accepted twenty of them for inclusion onto the schedule of events. At each conference, AWP provides many accessibility services including ASL interpretation, cued speech transliteration, computer assisted real time captioning, assistive listening devices, braille programs, accommodations for those requiring an attendant or assistant, and much more to attendees who need these services.

Notes 

American poetry
Literary societies
American writers' organizations